The International Federation of Gynaecology and Obstetrics, usually just FIGO ("fee'go") as the acronym of its French name , is a worldwide non-governmental organisation representing obstetricians and gynaecologists in over one hundred territories. It was founded on 26 July 1954 in Geneva, Switzerland, to "promote the well-being of women and to raise the standard of practice in obstetrics and gynaecology". Membership is currently composed of 132 professional societies ('National Member Societies') of obstetricians and gynaecologists worldwide.

The headquarters of FIGO was initially located at Geneva, Switzerland. The FIGO Secretariat is located at London, United Kingdom.

Core activities 
The aim of FIGO is to improve the health and well-being of women and newborns worldwide. FIGO works to enable every woman to achieve active participation in her own health and rights, and the highest possible standards of health. It is financed by dues of member societies, grants, and educational activities.

FIGO's work covers many critical aspects of obstetrics and gynaecology and women's health and rights, including:

 adolescent health
 cervical cancer
 environmental health
 refugee and migrant health
 noncommunicable diseases (NCDs)
 sexual and reproductive health and rights (SRHR)
 universal health coverage (UHC)

FIGO implements global programmes on specific women's health issues, in collaboration with National Member Societies and/or partner organisations. These include:

 Fistula Surgery Training Initiative
 Postpartum Family Planning (PPIUD)
 Advocating Safe Abortion Project
 Postpartum Haemorrhage (PPH)

FIGO Committees and Working Groups are dedicated to critical sub-specialty issues across obstetrics, gynecology and related fields:

 Contraception and Family Planning (Committee)
 Ethical and Professional Aspects of Human Reproduction and Women's Health (Committee)
 Fistula and Genital Trauma (Committee)
 Gynecologic Oncology (Committee)
 Human Rights, Refugees and Violence Against Women (Committee)
 Menstrual Disorders (Committee)
 Minimal Access Surgery (Committee)
 Pregnancy and Noncommunicable Diseases (Committee)
 Reproductive Developmental Environmental Health (Committee)
 Reproductive Medicine, Endocrinology and Infertility (Committee)
 Safe Abortion (Committee)
 Safe Motherhood and Newborn Health (Committee)
 Urogynecology and Pelvic Floor (Committee)
 Benign Breast Disease (Working Group)
 International Childbirth Initiative (Working Group)
 Postpartum Haemorrhage (Working Group)
 Preterm Birth (Working Group)

Classification systems

Uterine bleeding

In 2011 FIGO recognized two systems designed to aid research, education, and clinical care of women with abnormal uterine bleeding (AUB) in the reproductive years.

Ovarian cancer

Ovarian cancer is staged using the FIGO staging system and uses information obtained after surgery, which can include a total abdominal hysterectomy via midline laparotomy, removal of (usually) both ovaries and Fallopian tubes, (usually) the omentum, pelvic (peritoneal) washings, assessment of retroperitoneal lymph nodes (including the pelvic and para-aortic lymph nodes), appendectomy in suspected mucinous tumors, and pelvic/peritoneal biopsies for cytopathology.

Publications
Major publications include:

International Journal of Gynecology & Obstetrics - peer reviewed journal published monthly by Wiley Online Library.
"FIGO Newsletter" - published monthly, electronically
FIGO Ethics Guidelines have been reproduced (with commentary) in academic periodicals: e.g. (2006) 7 Medical Law International 361.

World Congress of Gynecology and Obstetrics

FIGO conducts a triennial meeting, the World Congress of Obstetrics and Gynecology. In addition the society sponsors fellowships, lectures, provides reports about women's health, and offers grants. Importantly through international committees consensus guidelines are achieved about evaluation and treatment of gynecological and obstetrical disorders.

Member associations

The following 124 professional societies are members of FIGO as of December 2010:

Afghan Society of Obstetricians and Gynaecologists
Albanian Association of Obstetrics and Gynaecology
American Congress of Obstetricians and Gynaecologists, The
Asociacion de Ginecologia y Obstetricia de Guatemala (AGOG)
Asociacion de Obstetricia y Ginecologia de Costa Rica
Associação Moçambicana de Obstetras e Ginecologistas (AMOG)
Association of Gynaecologists and Obstetricians of Tanzania, (The AGOTA)
Association of Gynecologists and Obstetricians of Macedonia
Association of Gynecologists and Obstetricians of Serbia, Montenegro and Republic Srpska (UGOSCGRS)
Association of Obstetricians and Gynaecologists of Malawi (AOGM)
Association of Obstetricians and Gynaecologists of Uganda
Association Sénégalaise de Gynécologie-Obstétrique (ASGO)
Bulgarian Society of Obstetrics and Gynecology, The
Chinese Society of Obstetrics and Gynecology, The
Collège National des Gynécologues et Obstétriciens Français
Croatian Society of Gynecologists and Obstetricians
Cyprus Gynaecological and Obstetrics Society
Czech Gynecological and Obstetrical Society
Dansk Selskab for Obstetrik og Gynækologi
Deutsche Gesellschaft für Gynäkologie und Geburtshilfe
Dutch Society of Obstetrics and Gynaecology, The
Egyptian Society of Gynaecology and Obstetrics, The
Emirate Medical Association
Eritrean Medical Association (ERIMA)
Ethiopian Society of Obstetricians and Gynecologists
Federaçao Brasileira das Sociedades de Ginecologia e Obstetricia (FEBRASGO)
Federación Argentina de Sociedades de Ginecología y Obstetricia
Federación Colombiana de Asociaciones de Obstetricia y Ginecología
Federación Ecuatoriana de Sociedades de Ginecología y Obstetricia
Federación Mexicana de Colegios de Obstetricia y Ginecologia (FEMECOG)
Federation of Obstetrics & Gynaecological Societies of India (FOGSI)
Finnish Gynecological Association
Georgian Obstetricians and Gynecologists Association (GOGA)
Grabham Society of Obstetricians and Gynaecologists, The
Hellenic Obstetrical and Gynaecological Society
Hungarian Society of Obstetrics and Gynaecology
Icelandic Society of Obstetrics and Gynecology
Institute of Obstetricians and Gynaecologists of the Royal College of Physicians of Ireland
Iraqi Society of Obstetrics & Gynecology (ISOG)
Israel Society of Obstetrics and Gynecology
Japan Society of Obstetrics and Gynecology
Jordanian Society of Obstetricians and Gynaecologists, The
Kenya Obstetrical and Gynaecological Society
Koninklijke BelgischeVerenigning voor Gynecologie en Verloskunde/Societé Royale Belge de Gynécologie et d’Obstetrique
Korean Society of Obstetrics and Gynecology
Kuwait Medical Association: The Profession of Obstetrics and Gynaecology
Kyrgyz Association of Obstetricians, Gynecologists and Neonatologists (KOAGN)
Latvian Association of Gynaecologists and Obstetricians
Libyan Obstetrical and Gynaecological Association
Lithuanian Association of Obstetricians and Gynecologists
Macau Association of Obstetric and Gynaecology
Malta College of Obstetricians and Gynaecologists
Myanmar Medical Association
National Association of Iranian Obstetricians & Gynecologists (NAIGO)
Nepal Society of Obstetricians and Gynaecologists (NESOG)
Norsk gynekologisk Forening (Norwegian Society for Gynecology and Obstetrics)
Obstetrical & Gynaecological Society of Hong Kong
Obstetrical & Gynaecological Society of Malaysia
Obstetrical & Gynaecological Society of Singapore
Obstetrical & Gynaecological Society of the Sudan
Obstetrical and Gynaecological Society of Bangladesh
Oesterreichische Gesellschaft fur Gynakologie und Geburtshilfe (Austrian Society of Gynaecology and Obstetrics)
Papua New Guinea Obstetrics and Gynaecology Society
Perkumpulan Obstetri Dan Ginekologi Indonesia (Indonesian Society of Obstetrics & Gynecology)
Philippine Obstetrical & Gynecological Society, INC
Polish Gynaecological Society (Polskie Towarzystwo Ginekologiczne)
Republic of Armenia Association of Obstetricians/Gynecologists and Neonatologists
Romanian Society of Obstetric and Gynecology
Royal Australian and New Zealand College of Obstetricians and Gynaecologists, The
Royal College of Obstetricians and Gynaecologists (UK)
Royal Thai College of Obstetricians and Gynaecologists, The
Russian Society of Obstetricians and Gynaecologists
Saudi Obstetrical and Gynaecological Society
Schweizerische Gesellschaft für Gynäkologie und Geburtshilf/Société Suisse de Gynécologie & Obstétrique
Shoqata e Obstetërve dhe Gjinekologëve te Kosovës/Kosovo Obstetrics and Gynaecology Association (KOGA)
Sierra Leone Association of Gynaecologists and Obstetricians
Slovak Society of Gynecology and Obstetrics
Slovene Association of Gynaecologists and Obstetricians
Sociedad Boliviana de Obstetricia y Ginecología
Sociedad Chilena de Obstetricia y Ginecología
Sociedad Cubana de Obstetricia y Ginecología
Sociedad de Ginecología y Obstetricia de El Salvador
Sociedad de Ginecología y Obstetricia de Honduras
Sociedad de ObstetriciayGinecología de Venezuela
Sociedad Dominicana de Obstetricia y Ginecologia
Sociedad Espanõla de Ginecología y Obstetricia
Sociedad Ginecotocologica del Uruguay
Sociedad Nicaragüense de Ginecología y Obstetricia
Sociedad Panamenã de Obstetricia y Ginecología
Sociedad Paraguaya de Ginecología y Obstetricia
Sociedad Peruana de Obstetricia y Ginecología
Sociedade Portuguesa de Obstetricia e Ginecologia
Società Italiana di Ginecologia e Ostetricia
Societé Algérienne de Gynécologye-Obstétrique
Societe de Gynecologie et d'Obstetrique du Benin et du Togo CUGO-CNHU
Société de Gynécologie et d’Obstétrique de Bénin
Societe de Gynecologie et d’Obstetrique de Côte d'Ivoire
Societé de Gynécologie et Obstétrique du Niger (SGON)
Societé de Gynécologues et Obstétriciens du Burkina (SOGOB)
Société Gabonaise de Gynécologie Obstétrique et de la Reproduction (SGGOR)
Société Guinéenne de Gynécologie-Obstétrique
Societe Haitienne d’Obstetrique et de Gynecologie
Société Libanaise d'Obstétrique et de Gynécologie (Lebanese Society of Obstetrics & Gynecology)
Société Luxembourgeoise de Gynécologie et d’Obstétrique
Societé Malienne de Gynécologie Obstétrique (SOMAGO)
Société Royale Marocaine de Gynécologie Obstétrique
Société Tunisienne de Gynécologie et d’Obstétrique
Society of Estonian Gynaecologists
Society of Gynaecologists and Obstetricians of Ghana (Ghana Medical Association)
Society of Gynaecology and Obstetrics of Nigeria (SOGON)
Society of Gynecologists and Obstetricians of Cameroon (SOGOC)
Society of Obstetricians and Gynaecologists of Pakistan
Society of Obstetricians and Gynaecologists of Canada, The/Societé des Obstétriciens et Gynécolgues du Canada
Society of Obstetricians and Gynecologists of Republic of Moldova
Society of Palestinian Gynaecologists and Obstetricians
South African Society of Obstetricians and Gynaecologists, The
Sri Lanka College of Obstetricians and Gynaecologists
Svensk Förening För Obstetrik & Gynekologi (The Swedish Society of Obstetrics and Gynecology)
Syrian Society of Obstetricians & Gynecologists
Taiwan Association of Obstetrics and Gynecology, The
Turkish Society of Obstetrics and Gynecology
Ukrainian Association of Obstetricians and Gynaecologists, The
Vietnam Gynaecology and Obstetrics Association VINAGOFPA
Zambia Association of Gynaecologists & Obstetricians (ZAGO)
Zimbabwe Society of Obstetricians and Gynaecologists, The

References

External links
 
International Journal of Gynaecology & Obstetrics

Health in the London Borough of Lambeth
International medical associations
International organisations based in London
Obstetrics and gynaecology organizations
Organisations based in the London Borough of Lambeth
Organizations established in 1954